Mount Kuro or Kurotake (literally Black Mountain) may refer to:

 Mount Kuro (Hokkaido)
 Mount Suisho, also known as Mount Kuro